The Iona was Scottish-built paddle steamer, purchased by Confederate agents for use as a blockade runner during the American Civil War. Following a collision with Chanticleer she sunk in the Upper Clyde near Fort Matilda in October 1862. The wreck, which lies around 27 m below chart datum, is now designated as a Historic Marine Protected Area by Historic Environment Scotland.

References

1855 ships
Ships built on the River Clyde
Merchant ships of the United Kingdom
Paddle steamers of the United Kingdom
Maritime incidents in October 1862
Protected Wrecks of Scotland
Blockade runners of the American Civil War
Historic Marine Protected Areas of Scotland